Chakhmaq (also Romanized as Chakhmāq; also known as Chakmak and Chaqmāq) is a village in Soleyman Rural District, Soleyman District, Zaveh County, Razavi Khorasan Province, Iran. At the 2006 census, its population was 2,065, in 482 families.

References 

Populated places in Zaveh County